Nicolás González may refer to:

 Nicolás González (cyclist) (born 1997), Chilean cyclist 
 Nico González (footballer, born 1988), currently playing for Racing Murcia FC
 Nicolás González (footballer, born 1992), currently playing for UD Villa de Santa Brígida
 Nicolás González (footballer, born 1994), currently playing for Defensores de Cambaceres
 Nicolás González (footballer, born 1995), currently playing for Rocha F.C.
 Nicolás González (footballer, born 1996), currently playing for Murciélagos F.C.
 Nicolás González (footballer, born 1997), currently playing for C.A. Progreso
 Nicolás González (footballer, born 1998), currently playing for ACF Fiorentina
 Nicolás González (footballer, born 1999), currently playing for Defensa y Justicia
 Nico González (footballer, born 2002), currently playing for Barcelona
 Nicolás González Casares, member of the European Parliament

See also 
 Nico (disambiguation)